Olympic Dam Airport  is an airport that serves the Olympic Dam mine in South Australia. There have been planned expansions for the airport starting in 2006 and ongoing in 2011. Alliance Airlines operate a public transport service between Olympic Dam and Adelaide.

General information
The airport's codes are OLP for FlightStats and IATA, YOLD for ICAO and it does not have an FFA code. Several car rental companies operate from the airport.

In 2007, there was a near mid-air collision between an Alliance Airlines plane and a charter flight. Flooding in the region in 2010 did not affect the airport.

2011 expansion proposal
Relocation discussions were underway in 2006, with a discussion about either expanding the Olympic Dam airport or building a new one close to Andamooka. The area was set to have 5,000 contractors brought in by BHP. It was planned that the airport would be relocated should the Olympic Dam mine expand to an open-cut configuration. Expansion plans outlined in 2011 included improving the airport to accommodate jets and passenger service. 2011 plans for the airport included making the runway an all-weather one. The planned location was between Roxby Downs and Andamooka. In March 2020, NRW Holdings was awarded a contract to upgrade the airport.

Airlines and destinations

Statistics
Olympic Dam Airport was ranked 48th in Australia for the number of revenue passengers served in financial year 2010–2011.

References

Airports in South Australia
Far North (South Australia)